The 2012 IIHF U20 World Championship (commonly known as the 2012 World Junior Ice Hockey Championships) was the 36th edition of the Ice Hockey World Junior Championship. It was hosted in Calgary and Edmonton, Alberta, Canada. It began on December 26, 2011, and ended with the gold medal game played in Calgary on January 5, 2012. Sweden defeated defending-champion Russia 1–0 in overtime to win their first title in 31 years. Russian forward Evgeny Kuznetsov was named MVP of the tournament. Denmark was relegated to Division I and Germany was promoted to the 2013 World Junior Ice Hockey Championships.

Canada missed the final for the first time in 11 years when they lost 6–5 against Russia in a semifinal in which Canada were down 6–1 halfway through the third period. However, the Canadians extended their consecutive medal streak at the tournament to 14 (5 gold, 6 silver, 3 bronze) with a 4–0 victory over Finland in the bronze medal game. The fourth-place finish for Finland was their best result in the tournament since 2006. The United States ended up in the relegation round for the first time since 1999.

Host city selection 
On February 1, 2008, Hockey Canada and the Canadian Hockey League announced that six groups had submitted letters of intent to bid to host the 2012 tournament:  Calgary/Edmonton; Halifax, Nova Scotia; London/Windsor, Ontario; Saskatoon, Saskatchewan; Toronto; and Winnipeg.  The London/Windsor, Halifax and Winnipeg bids withdrew before the application deadline, leaving three groups. Saskatoon was selected to host the 2010 tournament with Regina, Saskatchewan, leaving only the Calgary/Edmonton and Toronto bids for this tournament.

The Alberta bid, supported by the National Hockey League's Calgary Flames and Edmonton Oilers as well as the Western Hockey League's Calgary Hitmen and Edmonton Oil Kings, was selected to host the tournament on August 28, 2008.  It will be the second time the tournament has been hosted in the province; Red Deer served as the primary host of the 1995 World Junior Championship, while some tournament games were played in both Calgary and Edmonton.

Venues

Attendance
As part of their bid, the two cities projected that they would generate a tournament record attendance in excess of 475,000 fans and provide an economic benefit of $42 million to the province of Alberta.  Following a reserved offering of 10- and 21-game ticket packs for Edmonton and Calgary games respectively to season ticket holders of the Oilers, Oil Kings, Flames and Hitmen, the tournament committee held a lottery to award the right to purchase the remaining seats.  While the entry deadline was supposed to coincide with the conclusion of the 2011 tournament, organizers were flooded with so many entries that their website servers crashed.  Organizers were overwhelmed by the response; over 187,000 entries were received for the draw.

Calling the demand unprecedented, Hockey Canada announced that the 17,000 ticket packages made available to lottery winners had sold out in a matter of days, a year in advance of the tournament. While organizers were pleased with the result, the way the lottery was handled has angered fans who won the right to purchase tickets but were unable to do so as no tickets were left when their turn to buy arrived.

Ultimately, a new attendance record was set, but not by the margin initially anticipated. The total of 455,342 fans was 2,060 fans more than the previous record of 453,282 from 2009. Though many more tickets were sold as part of tournament packages, the IIHF only counts actual paid spectators in attendance in its figures.

Top division 
Each round was a round-robin tournament, where the teams played each other once within their group. The Preliminary Round was divided into two groups: Group A and Group B, which included five teams each. From each group, the top three teams qualified for the playoffs; the 1st-ranked teams earned a direct trip to the Semifinals, while the 2nd and 3rd-ranked teams qualified for the Quarterfinals. The 4th and 5th-ranked teams had to play in the Relegation Round, where the three best teams qualified for the Top Division tournament in 2013, with the last-placed team being relegated to the 2013 Division I tournament. In the Semifinals, the directly-qualified Semifinalists faced the winners from the Quarterfinals.

Rosters

Preliminary round

Group A 
All round robin games held in Calgary, Alberta, at the Scotiabank Saddledome.

All times local (MST/UTC−7)

Group B 
All round robin games held in Edmonton, Alberta, at Rexall Place.

All times local (MST/UTC−7)

Relegation round 
The results from matches between teams from the same group in the preliminary round were carried forward to this round.

All times local (MST/UTC−7)

Final round 
Bracket

Quarterfinals

Semifinals

Fifth place game

Bronze medal game

Final

Statistics

Scoring leaders

Goaltending leaders 
(minimum 40% team's total ice time)

Tournament awards

Most Valuable Player
 Forward:  Evgeny Kuznetsov

All-star team

 Goaltender:  Petr Mrázek
 Defencemen:  Brandon Gormley,  Oscar Klefbom
 Forwards:  Evgeny Kuznetsov,  Max Friberg,  Mikael Granlund

IIHF best player awards

 Goaltender:  Petr Mrázek
 Defenceman:  Brandon Gormley
 Forward:  Evgeny Kuznetsov

Final standings

Medalists

Source:

Gold medal celebration 
Sweden's gold medal win was their first since 1981, as well as their second gold medal in total. The gold medal was celebrated on January 7, 2012, in front of over 6,000 fans at Kungsträdgården in Stockholm.

Division I

Division I A
The Division I A tournament was played in Garmisch-Partenkirchen, Germany, from 11 to 17 December 2011.

Division I B
The Division I B tournament was played in Tychy, Poland, from 12 to 18 December 2011.

Division II

Division II A
The Division II A tournament was played in Donetsk, Ukraine, from 12 to 18 December 2011.

Division II B
The Division II B tournament was played in Tallinn, Estonia, from 10 to 16 December 2011.

Division III

The Division III tournament was played in Dunedin, New Zealand, from 16 to 22 January 2012. Although originally scheduled to participate, North Korea withdrew from the tournament for unspecified reasons.

References

External links 

 

 
Junior, World 2012
World Junior Ice Hockey Championships 2012
International ice hockey competitions hosted by Canada
World Junior
World Junior Ice Hockey Championships
World Junior Ice Hockey Championships
World Junior Ice Hockey Championships
Ice hockey competitions in Edmonton
Ice hockey competitions in Calgary
World Junior Ice Hockey Championships, 2012
World Junior Ice Hockey Championships, 2012
World Junior Ice Hockey Championships
World Junior Ice Hockey Championships